Bambaru Avith (The Wasps are Here) is a 1978 Sri Lankan Sinhala drama film directed by Dharmasena Pathiraja and produced by director himself with Thilak Godamanne for Saranga Salaroo. It explores tradition and exploitation following the introduction of capitalism to a tiny fishing village and the subsequent clash between the local boss and the urban outsider.

Plot
In a fishing village, Anton Aiya is an exploiter who outwardly resembles and acts like a regular fisherman, but he exploits and feeds off the other fishermen. Into this setting arrives members of the urban entrepreneurial youth. They have adapted to Western Culture, dressing like Westerners and preferring Western music.

Conflict arises between Anton Aiya and Baby Mahattaya (Victor), a representative of the urban youth. A middle-class leftist Weerasena is also of this group. The arrival of these youths has clearly caused a social crisis requiring a solution and all Weerasena can do is stand on a platform and deliver a speech that no one listens to. He finally leaves for the city.

Cast
 Joe Abeywickrema as Anton Aiya
 Vijaya Kumaratunga as Victor, Baby Mahattaya
 Malini Fonseka as Helen
 Cyril Wickramage as Cyril
 Wimal Kumara de Costa as Weerasena
 Amarasiri Kalansuriya as Sanath
 Daya Thennakoon as Francis
 Ruby de Mel as Celestina, Helen's mother
 Somasiri Dehipitiya as Seba
 Vincent Vaas as Anton's friend
 Daya Alwis as Church father
 W. Jayasiri as Michael
 S. H. Somapala as Christopher
 Piyasena Ahangama as Navy officer

Music
Premasiri Khemadasa composed the music for the film. The two main songs are "Udumbara" and "Handunagathoth Oba Ma."

Critical reception 
Steve Rose of The Guardian, in a 2021 review of a restored version of the film, gave it a score of 4/5 stars. He wrote: "this realist drama from 1978 is well worth the effort, not only because it is a landmark of Sri Lankan cinema... but also because it addresses universal socio-political themes with elegant simplicity." He concluded: "Despite the realist authenticity and political intent, there’s also a gentle sensuality to the story, with soft folk music and moments of tender romance. The characters are believably complex and conflicted, and the sandy, sun-bleached landscape is evocatively portrayed. It feels like a precious snapshot of a place and time rarely glimpsed."

Awards and nominations
 Sri Lankan representative at 1978 Moscow International Film Festival
 Screened at Mostra and Los Angeles Film Festivals
 Presidential awards for the Best Film and Best Director - 1979
 OCIC awards for Best Film and Best Director - 1979
 Named the fourth Best Sri Lankan Film of the first 50 years by a Presidential council
 Featured in the Cannes Classics 2020 -  4K film and sound restoration was carried out by L’Immagine Ritrovata using the sole-surviving 35mm film positive.

References

External links

 

1978 films
1978 drama films
Sri Lankan drama films
1970s Sinhala-language films